Roosevelt is an unincorporated community and census-designated place (CDP) in Klickitat County, Washington, United States. The population was 156 at the 2010 census, up from 79 at the 2000 census. The Roosevelt Regional Landfill, one of the largest landfills in the United States, is located at Roosevelt.

The community was named after President Theodore Roosevelt.

Geography 
Roosevelt is in southeastern Klickitat County on the north bank of the Columbia River, sitting across from Arlington, Oregon.

Climate
This region experiences warm (but not hot) and dry summers, with no average monthly temperatures above . According to the Köppen Climate Classification system, Roosevelt has a warm-summer Mediterranean climate, abbreviated "Csb" on climate maps.

Demographics
As of the census of 2000, there were 79 people, 33 households, and 20 families residing in the CDP. The population density was 20.5 people per square mile (7.9/km2). There were 46 housing units at an average density of 11.9/sq mi (4.6/km2). The racial makeup of the CDP was 82.28% White, 16.46% from other races, and 1.27% from two or more races. Hispanic or Latino of any race were 16.46% of the population.

There were 33 households, out of which 27.3% had children under the age of 18 living with them, 54.5% were married couples living together, and 36.4% were non-families. 36.4% of all households were made up of individuals, and 12.1% had someone living alone who was 65 years of age or older. The average household size was 2.39 and the average family size was 3.10.

In the CDP, the population was spread out, with 24.1% under the age of 18, 8.9% from 18 to 24, 15.2% from 25 to 44, 35.4% from 45 to 64, and 16.5% who were 65 years of age or older. The median age was 45 years. For every 100 females, there were 154.8 males. For every 100 females age 18 and over, there were 114.3 males.

The median income for a household in the CDP was $45,694, and the median income for a family was $46,250. Males had a median income of $38,750 versus $0 for females. The per capita income for the CDP was $11,083. None of the population or families were below the poverty line.

References

Census-designated places in Klickitat County, Washington
Census-designated places in Washington (state)
Washington (state) populated places on the Columbia River